Sunclass Airlines A/S (formerly Thomas Cook Airlines Scandinavia) is a Danish charter airline that operates charter services from Norway, Sweden, Denmark and Finland. The company is affiliated with Ving Group, a Nordic tour operator. It and Ving Group were a part of Thomas Cook Group until 23 December 2019 when Norwegian investor Petter Stordalen and Strawberry Group rebranded the company as Sunclass Airlines.

The airline was originally founded in 1994 as Premiair. It was renamed MyTravel Airways in 2002 before being renamed Thomas Cook Airlines Scandinavia when Thomas Cook Group acquired the previous parent company MyTravel Group. In 2019, the airline was renamed Sunclass Airlines after Thomas Cook Group entered liquidation.

History

The airline's roots trace back to two airlines: Conair of Scandinavia owned by Danish Spies Group and Scanair, of the Swedish SLG - Scandinavian Leisure Group. It formed when the two charter airlines were merged and was established on 1 January 1994 as Premiair A/S.

In 1994, SLG was acquired by Airtours; on 1 May 2002, the airline was renamed MyTravel Airways A/S (MyTravel Airways Scandinavia).

In May 2008, after MyTravel Group was acquired by Thomas Cook Group, the airline was renamed to Thomas Cook Airlines Scandinavia.

On 23 September 2019, Thomas Cook Group plc went into administration and ceased trading with immediate effect after failing to secure £200 million in emergency funding. Causing the airline to initially suspended operations, but has since resumed flights. It continued to operate flights to leisure destinations, mainly in the Mediterranean and the Canary Islands, as well as some long-haul service from several bases in the Nordic countries until November 2019.

On 30 October 2019, it was announced that a new investment consortium consisting of Norwegian businessman Petter Stordalen (Strawberry Group) and two private firms (Altor Equity Partners and TDR Capital) had acquired Ving Group (also known as Thomas Cook Northern Europe) from AlixPartners which handled the acquisitions of Thomas Cook Airlines Scandinavia, Ving, Tjäreborg and Spies and was also one of the liquidators of Thomas Cook Group. Following the acquisition, Thomas Cook Airlines Scandinavia was renamed Sunclass Airlines and acquired a new air operator's certificate (AOC).

While the Thomas Cook Airlines Scandinavia name would continue to be present to passengers including on tickets, airport signage and aircraft liveries for an unspecified period during the rebranding process to the Sunclass Airlines name, the airline would retain Thomas Cook's original "sunny heart" logo as part of its branding.

On 26 November 2019, it was announced the airline had secured its new AOC.

In December 2020, just over a year since its rebrand, Sunclass unveiled a rebrand, doing away with the sunny heart logo associated with the Thomas Cook Group to make way for its own new identity.

In November 2021, Sunclass Airlines announced an Airbus A330neo would be delivered in 2022 for its long-haul operations.

Destinations

Fleet

Current fleet

, the Sunclass Airlines fleet consists of the following aircraft:

Former fleet
Sunclass Airlines had previously operated the following aircraft:

See also
List of airlines of Denmark

References

External links
 

Airlines of Denmark
Airlines established in 1994
Companies based in Copenhagen
Charter airlines
Danish companies established in 1994